The suprangular or surangular is a jaw bone found in most land vertebrates, except mammals.  Usually in the back of the jaw, on the upper edge, it is connected to all other jaw bones: dentary, angular, splenial and articular. It is often a muscle attachment site.

References

Vertebrate anatomy